The Tokomaru River is a river of the Manawatū-Whanganui Region of the North Island of New Zealand. It rises to the southeast of Shannon and initially flows northeast down a long valley in the Tararua Range before turning northwest to reach the edge of the Manawatū Plain near the town of Tokomaru.

See also
List of rivers of New Zealand

References

Rivers of Manawatū-Whanganui
Rivers of New Zealand